Nikos Katelis-Λορεν, better known by his stage name Katman, is known in Greece for appearing in various trash TV shows, including the show hosted by Annita Pania called Je T'Aime, where he was a performer of satirical songs.

Political life
Katman became a candidate of the Greek Ecologists party for the Aetolia-Acarnania prefecture in the European Parliament elections in 2009 after a proposal was made by the party's president Dimosthenis Vergis. His speech was aired live during Annita Pania's show Ta Paratragouda from Kolonaki Square in Athens. He did not get elected. During a TV commentary discussion,  Michalis Tremopoulos of the Ecologist Greens party mentioned in criticism to Vergis that the Greek people would never vote for a party composed of "mentally challenged" individuals, in obvious reference to Katelis.

References

Year of birth missing (living people)
Living people
21st-century Greek male singers
Greek television personalities
People from Aetolia-Acarnania